The Thirtieth Oklahoma Legislature was a meeting of the legislative branch of the government of Oklahoma, composed of the Oklahoma Senate and the Oklahoma House of Representatives. The state legislature met in regular session at the Oklahoma State Capitol in Oklahoma City from January 5 to July 22, 1965, during the first term of Governor Henry Bellmon. It was the last time the state legislature met only once every two years, and the first time since A. C. Hamlin left office in 1910 that the legislature included black members.

Lieutenant Governor Leo Winters served as President of the Senate, Clem McSpadden served as President pro tempore of the Oklahoma Senate, and J. D. McCarty served as Speaker of the Oklahoma House of Representatives.

Dates of session
January 5-July 22, 1965
Previous: 29th Legislature • Next: 31st Legislature

Major events
The state legislature impeached Oklahoma Supreme Court Justice N. B. Johnson, convicting him on May 12, 1965.

Party composition

Senate

House

Leadership
President of the Senate: Lieutenant Governor Leo Winters
Senate President Pro Tem: Clem McSpadden
Speaker of the House: J. D. McCarty
Speaker Pro Tempore: Rex Privett
Majority Floor Leader: Leland Wolf
Minority Leader: G. T. Blankenship

Staff
Chief Clerk of the House: Louise Stockton

Members

Senate

Table based on 2005 Oklahoma Almanac.

House of Representatives

Table based on database of historic members.

References

External links
Oklahoma Senate
Oklahoma House of Representatives

Oklahoma legislative sessions
1965 in Oklahoma
1966 in Oklahoma
1965 U.S. legislative sessions
1966 U.S. legislative sessions